Molodo is a village and seat of the commune of Kala Siguida in the Cercle of Niono in the Ségou Region of southern-central Mali. The village was created in 1945 to accommodate labourers working for the Office du Niger irrigation scheme. It lies only 4 km from Niono on opposite side of the Fala de Molodo.

References

Populated places in Ségou Region